The 2011–12 Syrian Premier League season is the 41st since its establishment. The 2010–11 league campaign was suspended due to the Syrian civil war.

This seasons league will feature two stages. Stage one will pit two groups of eight teams and kicked off on 9 October. The top four off each group would advance to the Championship pool to determine the overall league champions. The bottom four placed sides would enter the relegation pool to determine who would be relegated.

Teams
Two teams were promoted from the 2nd tier league; Hurriya SC based in Aleppo and Baniyas Refinery SC representing the city of Baniyas. No club was relegated from the previous season due to the 2011 Syrian uprising which forced the league to be suspended.

Stadia and locations

Stage One

Each team plays each other once, top four advanced to the championship pool, bottom four enter relegation pool

Group A

Group A Playoff

A single game playoff match was required by the 4th and 5th placed teams due to both sides being level on points. Head to head results do not matter. Winner advance to Championship Pool and loser advance to Relegation Pool.

Group B

Group B Playoff

A single game playoff match was required by the 4th and 5th placed teams due to both sides being level on points. Head to head results do not matter. Winner advance to Championship Pool and loser advance to Relegation Pool.

Stage Two

Championship Pool

Relegation Pool

Syrian Premier League seasons
1
Syria